Constantine Henry Phipps, 1st Marquess of Normanby,  (15 May 1797 – 28 July 1863), styled Viscount Normanby between 1812 and 1831 and known as The Earl of Mulgrave between 1831 and 1838, was a British Whig politician and author. He notably served as Lord Lieutenant of Ireland from 1835 to 1839 and as Home Secretary from 1839 to 1841 and was British Ambassador to France between 1846 and 1852.

Early life and education
Normanby was the son of Henry Phipps, 1st Earl of Mulgrave and Martha Sophia, daughter of Christopher Thompson Maling. His great-grandfather William Phipps had married Lady Catherine Annesley, who was the daughter and heiress of James Annesley, 3rd Earl of Anglesey and his wife Lady Catherine Darnley (an illegitimate daughter of King James II by his mistress Catherine Sedley, Countess of Dorchester). Lady Catherine Darnley had later married John Sheffield, 1st Duke of Buckingham and Normanby, and hence Constantine Phipps, 2nd Earl of Mulgrave and later 1st Marquess of Normanby was the step-great-great-grandson of the 1st Duke of Buckingham and Normanby. He was educated at Harrow and Trinity College, Cambridge, where he was the second President of the Cambridge Union Society.

Lt.-Gen. Sir Henry Warre was his first cousin, born to his mother's youngest sister, who married Sir William Warre.

Political career
After attaining his majority, he was returned on his father's interest for Scarborough in 1818. However, in the summer of 1819, he began to break with his family's Tory politics, and signalised his conversion to the Whigs by joining Brooks' Club on 3 December. When Parliament was dissolved in 1820, Normanby was in Florence, Italy, to which he was a regular visitor. His brother Charles kept up the family interest with the Scarborough corporation, and Normanby was returned in absentia in March, despite being politically at odds with his father. This state of affairs was not to last long: in May, Normanby was compelled to take the Chiltern Hundreds by Lord Mulgrave, to vacate the seat for Mulgrave's brother Edmund.

His standing as a former Tory minister's son made Normanby valuable to the Whigs, and they hoped to return him to Parliament in another seat. An attempt was made to have him put in at St Ives at a by-election in 1821, but support proved to be lacking, and Normanby withdrew without contesting the seat. The illness and death of William Plumer in the beginning of 1822 allowed him to take his seat in February for Higham Ferrers, a pocket borough of the Whig grandee Earl Fitzwilliam. He made a considerable reputation by political pamphlets and by his speeches in the house. He was returned for Malton at the general election of 1826, another one of Fitzwilliam's boroughs. He was already known as a writer of romantic tales, The English in Italy (1825); in the same year he made his appearance as a novelist with Matilda, and in 1828 he produced another novel, Yes and No. He declined to be nominated again for Malton in 1830, anticipating the imminent death of his father, and was thus out of Parliament when Lord Grey formed a government in November 1830. Normanby hoped for employment by the foreign office, but none was forthcoming. Through Lord Durham, Normanby solicited a writ in acceleration from Grey in early 1831, which would have brought him up to the House of Lords before his father's death; but Normanby succeeded to the Earldom of Mulgrave on his father's death in April, rendering it moot.

In 1832, Mulgrave was sent out as Governor of Jamaica and was afterwards appointed Lord Lieutenant of Ireland (1835–1839). On his visit to Wexford in 1836 he heard a Congratulatory Address in the ancient Forth and Bargy dialect, then already on the point of becoming extinct. He was created Marquess of Normanby on 25 June 1838, and held successively the offices of colonial secretary and home secretary in the last years of Lord Melbourne's ministry. While Colonial Secretary, he wrote a letter of instructions to William Hobson, in which the government's policy for the sovereignty of New Zealand was set out.

Diplomatic career
From 1846 to 1852 he was ambassador at Paris, and from 1854 to 1858 minister at Florence. The publication in 1857 of a journal kept in Paris during the stormy times of 1848 (A Year of Revolution), brought him into violent controversy with Louis Blanc, and he came into conflict with Lord Palmerston and William Ewart Gladstone, after his retirement from the public service, on questions of French and Italian policy.

Family
Lord Normanby married Maria Liddell (1798–1882), daughter of Thomas Liddell, 1st Baron Ravensworth, in 1818. He died in London on 28 July 1863, aged 66, and was succeeded in his titles by his son George. The Marchioness of Normanby died in October 1882, aged 84.

Writings
 The English in Italy, a novel in three volumes (1825):
 
 
 
  (four editions).
 Historiettes, in three volumes (1827):
 
 
 
 The English in France, in three volumes (1828):
 
 
 
 Yes and No: a Tale of the Day, in two volumes (1828):
 
 
 The Contrast, in three volumes (1832):

Notes

References
Directory of Royal Genealogical Data, Brian Tompsett, as of 1 March 2003;  
Letter of Lord Normanby to William Hobson, 14 August 1839;  - starting near the bottom of this page and continuing to subsequent pages.

External links 
 

Normanby
Normanby
Members of the Privy Council of the United Kingdom
Normanby
Normanby, Constantine Phipps, 1st Marquess of
Normanby, Constantine Phipps, 1st Marquess of
Normanby, Constantine Phipps, 1st Marquess of
Normanby, Constantine Phipps, 1st Marquess of
Normanby, Constantine Phipps, 1st Marquess of
Normanby, Constantine Phipps, 1st Marquess of
Normanby, Constantine Phipps, 1st Marquess of
Normanby, Constantine Phipps
Normanby, Constantine Phipps, 1st Marquess of
Normanby, Constantine Phipps, 1st Marquess of
Whig (British political party) MPs for English constituencies
UK MPs 1818–1820
UK MPs 1820–1826
UK MPs 1826–1830
UK MPs who inherited peerages
UK MPs who were granted peerages
Ambassadors of the United Kingdom to France
Constantine
1
Peers of the United Kingdom created by Queen Victoria